For Your Entertainment may refer to:

 For Your Entertainment (album), a 2009 album by Adam Lambert
 "For Your Entertainment" (song), the title track
 f.y.e. (For Your Entertainment), a chain of entertainment media retail stores operated by Trans World Entertainment
 "For Your Entertainment", a song by The Charlatans (UK) from Simpatico
 "For Your Entertainment", a song by Unwound from Repetition